Arnside Tower is a late-medieval tower house (or Pele tower) between Arnside and Silverdale immediately to the south of Arnside Knott in Cumbria, England.

History

Arnside Tower was built in the second half of the 15th century. Tower houses were built throughout the border regions of northern England and southern Scotland because of the threat posed by Border Reivers. Constructed of limestone rubble, the tower was originally five storeys high, measuring 50 feet by 34 feet. The tower was built with an adjacent wing of equal height built onto the side of the tower in a style common in Scotland, but rare in English tower houses. Historian Anthony Emery suggests that the design may have been influenced by that at Ashby de la Zouch Castle, rebuilt in 1464 by Lord Hastings. The tower suffered a serious fire in 1602 but after repairs remained in use; the historian Anthony Emery states that the tower was in use until the end of the 17th century, but the historian Roy Palmer states that William Coward and his sister Agnes Wheeler lived there at the end of the 18th century.

One of the walls of the tower collapsed around 1900, and as of 2014, English Heritage considered that the condition of the castle was very bad, and that urgent works were required.  Arnside Tower is a Scheduled Monument and Grade II* listed building.

Tourism

The tower is in private ownership and is in a ruinous state.  The local tourist board recommends that good views of the tower can be seen from the public footpath which runs alongside.

See also

Grade II* listed buildings in South Lakeland
Listed buildings in Arnside
Castles in Great Britain and Ireland
List of castles in England

References

Bibliography
Emery, Anthony. (1996) Greater Medieval Houses of England and Wales, 1300-1500: Northern England. Cambridge: Cambridge University Press. .
Pettifer, Adrian. (2002) English Castles: a Guide by Counties. Woodbridge, UK: Boydell Press. .

External links
Drone video of the tower showing exterior and interior of the remains

Castles in Cumbria
Grade II* listed buildings in Cumbria
Scheduled monuments in Cumbria
Ruins in Cumbria
Peel towers in Cumbria
Arnside